Spinulata julius is a moth in the family Cossidae. It is found in Brazil.

The wingspan is about 50 mm. The forewings are greyish brown shading on the costal and outer margins. The inner margin is shaded with whitish ochre. There is a large dark cinnamon brown spot medially in the cell, inwardly edged by a black line. The hindwings are white.

References

Natural History Museum Lepidoptera generic names catalog

Cossulinae
Moths described in 1921